Atakhan Abilov (Атахан Вели Абилов), is a Talysh national minority and human rights activist from Azerbaijan, lawyer and author of books on International law. He has refugee status from the Russian Government and UN, as his colleagues from the "Voice of Talysh" newspaper's editorial staff have already been convicted and have received real terms of imprisonment in Azerbaijan.

Biography
Abilov is a Talish public activist. While being an independent candidate from #75 Lankaran-Masalli constituency in Azerbaijan, he claimed that bad roads makes travel to Lankaran from the mountain villages close to impossible. Despite the 1999 Azerbaijani official census reported, that there were 76,800 Talysh in Azerbaijan, Abilov claimed that true number is around 320,000.

According to Amnesty International, Atakhan Abilov, a "Talysh activist, was allegedly detained by officials from the Ministry of National Security [of Azerbaijan]. His apartment was also searched and he was allegedly dismissed from his job at the Baku State University on account of his political convictions". In 2007 he subsequently left Azerbaijan for Russia.

Abilov is one of de facto refugees who has received such a status from the Russian government. The United Nations refugee organization also granted him the same status that allows him to leave Russia for a third country. But he waited in Moscow for his family to get out of Azerbaijan.

According to a December 3 joint declaration by Talysh leaders, on November 30, 2008 Atakhan Abilov was assaulted in Moscow by three masked men. Abilov was subsequently hospitalized with a concussion and a broken nose.

Monographs

Author of monographs, presenting an analysis of international human rights standards in relation to the legislation of the Azerbaijan Republic  and the author of 3 books on the relations of Azerbaijan with the Council of Europe (Council of Europe and Azerbaijan; European Court of Human Rights and Azerbaijan, Azerbaijan in the European family) also co-authored a textbook on Private International Law, written in the law of Azerbaijan Republic. He participated in preparing several drafts of legislative acts adopted by the Parliament of the Republic of Azerbaijan, Azerbaijan is the author of the draft law on private international law.

References

External links
  Азербайджан для меня –  прежде всего Родина
Azərbaycanda ölüm eskadronu
Ataxan Əbilov: Hüquq müdafiəçisi Hilal Məmmədova “İran casusu” ittihamı absurddur
Ataxan Əbilov: "Yaxşı əsər sərhəd tanımır"
 Атахан Абилов: «Гилал Мамедов подвергается пыткам и обвиняется в шпионаже в пользу Ирана»

Azerbaijani people of Talysh descent
Azerbaijani human rights activists
Human rights abuses in Azerbaijan
Talysh people
The National Talysh Movement
Ural State Law University alumni